Ed Wubbe (Amsterdam, 1957) is a Dutch choreographer.

Since 1992 he has been artistic director of the Scapino Ballet in Rotterdam.

Selection of choreographies
 Oppervlakte (1981) - Introdans Arnhem
 Afstand (1982) - Introdans Arnhem
 Cellorganics (1983) - Werkcentrum Dans Rotterdam
 Frasen (1984) - Introdans Arnhem
 Simple Manouvres (1985) - Introdans Arnhem
 Another Journey (1985) - Introdans Arnhem
 White Streams (1986) - Introdans Arnhem
 Carmina Burana (1987) - Introdans Arnhem
 Nono (1987) - Introdans Arnhem
 Schlager (1988) - Introdans Arnhem
 Messiah (1988) - Introdans Arnhem
 Blue Tattoo (1988) - Scapino Ballet Rotterdam
 Gollywogwalk (1989) - Introdans Arnhem
 The Light of the Sun (1989) - Introdans Arnhem
 De Dood en het Meisje (1989) - Introdans Arnhem
 Solo - (1991) - Introdans Arnhem
 Kathleen (1992) - Scapino Ballet Rotterdam
 Romeo en Julia (1995) - Scapino Ballet Rotterdam
 Nico (1997) samen met John Cale - Scapino Ballet Rotterdam
 Songs for Drella (2011) samen met Marco Goecke - Scapino Ballet Rotterdam
 Pearl (2012) samen met Combattimento Consort Amsterdam - Scapino Ballet Rotterdam
 Le Chat Noir (2013) - Scapino Ballet Rotterdam
 Pas de Deux (2016) samen met Michiel Borstlap - Scapino Ballet Rotterdam
 TING! (2016)) samen met Nits- Scapino Ballet Rotterdam

References 

Dutch choreographers
1957 births
Entertainers from Amsterdam
Living people